

Ælfhun (or Ælphunus) was a medieval Bishop of Dunwich.

Ælfhun was consecrated between 789 and 793 and died about 798. The Anglo-Saxon Chronicle records that he died at Sudbury, Suffolk and his body was carried back to Dunwich for burial. A Portland stone statue of Ælfhun stands on The Croft at Sudbury, sculpted in 1999 by Alan Michlewaite.

References

External links
 

Bishops of Dunwich (ancient)
798 deaths
Year of birth unknown